The cabinet of Constantin Crețulescu was the government of Romania from 1 March to 5 August 1867.

Ministers
The ministers of the cabinet were as follows:

President of the Council of Ministers:
Constantin Crețulescu (1 March - 5 August 1867)
Minister of the Interior: 
Ion C. Brătianu (1 March - 5 August 1867)
Minister of Foreign Affairs: 
Ștefan Golescu (1 March - 5 August 1867)
Minister of Finance:
Alexandru Văsescu (1 March - 5 August 1867)
Minister of Justice:
Constantin Crețulescu (1 March - 5 August 1867)
Minister of War:
Col. Tobias Gherghely (1 March - 24 May 1867)
Col. Gheorghe Adrian (24 May - 5 August 1867)
Minister of Religious Affairs:
Dimitrie C. Brătianu (1 March - 5 August 1867)
Minister of Public Works:
(interim) Dimitrie C. Brătianu (1 March - 5 August 1867)

References

Cabinets of Romania
Cabinets established in 1867
Cabinets disestablished in 1867
1867 establishments in Romania
1867 disestablishments in Romania